Burdett may refer to:

Places
Burdett, Alberta, Canada

United States
Burdett, Kansas, a city
Burdett, Mississippi, an unincorporated community
Burdett, Missouri, an unincorporated community
Burdett, New York, a village

Other uses
Burdett (surname)
Burdett baronets, in England and Ireland
Burdett College, based in Boston, Massachusetts (1879–1999)

See also
 Burdette (disambiguation)